Lanhee Joseph Chen (born July 4, 1978) is an American policy advisor, attorney, and academic. Chen serves as the David and Diane Steffy Fellow in American Public Policy Studies at the Hoover Institution, director of domestic policy studies and lecturer in the public policy program at Stanford University, and lecturer in law at Stanford Law School.

Chen was the policy director for the 2012 Mitt Romney presidential campaign and Romney's Chief Policy Adviser. He has been described as the "orchestra leader" behind the Romney 2012 campaign. Romney confidante Beth Myers described Chen as the person Romney relied on "entirely" for policy direction. Chen was also a senior adviser to the 2016 presidential campaign of Senator Marco Rubio. He has twice been the senior policy adviser to the National Republican Senatorial Committee and is frequently consulted by Senate Republicans for his views on a wide range of policy subjects.

Chen was nominated by President Barack Obama and confirmed by the U.S. Senate to a seat on the bipartisan and independent Social Security Advisory Board, which advises the president, Congress, and the Social Security Administrator on Social Security policies. He was recommended for the post by Senate Republican Leader Mitch McConnell. His term expired in September 2018.

Chen currently serves as chair of the board of directors of El Camino Health, a major hospital in the Silicon Valley. Chen was the Republican nominee for the 2022 California State Controller election.

Early life and education
Chen was born in Fayetteville, North Carolina, but grew up in Rowland Heights, California, the son of immigrants from Taiwan. He speaks Taiwanese Hokkien more fluently than Mandarin Chinese. His parents are from Yunlin County, Taiwan.

Chen attended John A. Rowland High School, where he founded the Junior State of America (JSA) Chapter in 1992, and was Chapter President through the 1993–1994 academic year. Chen was an accomplished speaker and debater in high school, and was one of the top students in California and nationally in the International Extemporaneous speaking and Lincoln-Douglas debate. He was also one of the nation's top student senators in the 1994 National Speech and Debate Association John C. Stennis National Student Congress.

After graduating from high school, he went to Harvard University, where he earned an A.B. in Government in 1999, magna cum laude, an A.M. in Political Science, a J.D. cum laude, and a Ph.D. in Political Science. At Harvard, he participated in political and policy-oriented extracurricular activities. In 1999, Chen was a co-president of Harvard Model Congress. The topic of his Ph.D. dissertation, "Essays on Elections," was a look at electoral politics, which included analyses of judicial elections, presidential elections, and the impact of redistricting on electoral outcomes. His dissertation advisers included political scientists Sidney Verba and Gary King.

At Harvard, Chen roomed with Tom Cotton, US Senator representing Arkansas, and Bom Kim.

Career

Political and policy work
After graduating with his first degree in 1999, Chen moved to Washington, D.C. to work at a lobbying firm.

Chen served in 2014 and again in 2018 as a senior adviser on policy to the National Republican Senatorial Committee. Prior to serving as Romney's chief campaign policy adviser, he joined Romney's Free and Strong America PAC in 2011 as policy director. Previously, he was deputy campaign manager and policy director on California Insurance Commissioner Steve Poizner's campaign for governor, Domestic Policy Director during Romney's 2008 campaign for president, and Senior Counselor to the Deputy Secretary of Health and Human Services. He was the healthcare adviser for the George W. Bush 2004 presidential campaign. He was also an Associate Attorney at the international law firm of Gibson, Dunn & Crutcher LLP. In 2003, Chen was the Winnie Neubauer Visiting Fellow in Health Policy Studies at The Heritage Foundation, an American conservative think tank based in Washington, D.C.

In 2015, Chen was named one of the POLITICO 50, a list of the top "thinkers, doers, and visionaries transforming American politics". He earned a similar honor in 2012, when he was named to a list of POLITICO's "50 Politicos to Watch". In 2012, Chen was called a "rising star" of the Republican Party.

Chen announced his candidacy for the California State Controller in July 2021, seeking to replace termed out controller Betty Yee. He lost to Malia Cohen in the 2022 California State Controller election.

Media personality
Chen was named a CNN Political Commentator in 2016, and is believed to be the first Asian American to hold that position. He is often on television and radio, and frequently appears on a variety of networks, including ABC, CBS, NBC, CNN, MSNBC, FOX News, CNBC, FOX Business Network, Bloomberg TV and the BBC. He has appeared as a roundtable guest on ABC This Week, Face the Nation, Meet the Press, and Fox News Sunday and is a guest on top television political programming, including MSNBC's Morning Joe and MTP Daily, and CNN's State of the Union and The Lead with Jake Tapper. Chen is also a frequent guest on the Hugh Hewitt Show, a conservative talk radio program. He was also one of the lead commentators on Bloomberg TV's 2014 election night coverage with Mark Halperin and John Heilemann. He is a favorite guest on the libertarian talk radio show, The Armstrong and Getty Show.

He periodically hosts a podcast called "Crossing Lines with Lanhee Chen".

Academic 
Chen holds multiple appointments at Stanford University. In addition to his roles at the Hoover Institution, School of Law, and Public Policy Program, he is also an affiliated faculty member of the Center on Democracy, Development and the Rule of Law in the Freeman-Spogli Institute for International Studies and on the Faculty Steering Committee of the Haas Center for Public Service. In 2017, Chen served as the William E. Simon Distinguished Visiting Professor at the School of Public Policy at Pepperdine University. From 2010 to 2011, he was a visiting scholar at the Institute for Governmental Studies at the University of California, Berkeley. During his time as a graduate student, Chen taught extensively as a teaching fellow and won the Harvard University Certificate for Distinction in Teaching eight times.

Business 
Chen is a Strategic Advisor with NewRoad Capital Partners, a private equity fund focused on growth equity investing. He advises on the fund's health care investments.

Nonprofit work
Chen is a member of the board of trustees of the Junior Statesmen Foundation and is on the advisory board of the Partnership for the Future of Medicare.

He was named the inaugural director and currently serves as a senior adviser to the Aspen Economic Strategy Group, a project of the Aspen Institute co-chaired by Henry Paulson and Erskine Bowles, aimed at gathering, in a non-partisan spirit, a diverse range of distinguished leaders and thinkers to address significant structural challenges in the U.S. economy.

In 2015, Chen was selected as a member of the Committee of 100, a membership organization of Chinese Americans dedicated to the spirit of excellence and achievement in America.

Policy positions

Healthcare
Chen has argued for repeal of President Obama's healthcare law. More recently, he has stated that changes to Obamacare can help reduce the deficit and that the law is problematic because it distorts the healthcare marketplace. He contributed to a conservative, market-based replacement for the Affordable Care Act, which was published by the American Enterprise Institute in 2015.

Taxes and domestic economic plan
Chen advised Romney on tax policy. Chen proposed in part a flat tax or "flatter" tax, and tax simplification.

Chen is a proponent of the "Feldstein cap"—the proposal by Harvard's Martin Feldstein to cap the tax reduction that each taxpayer could get from tax expenditures to 2 percent of his or her adjusted gross income. Chen also has said that Romney would "make permanent" the Bush tax cuts from 2001 and 2003.

Chen and Romney are advocates for so-called "paycheck protection" (laws barring unions from automatically deducting fees from paychecks for political activities).

Chen said that Romney would get "rid of Dodd-Frank" and replace it with regulation "that works". He said that Romney's plan would instead use more limited regulation with more "reasonable" regulation, including those that govern derivatives and "some kind of consumer protection".

East Asia
Chen criticized the Obama administration for its "pivot" to Asia, arguing that it lacked substance and was not pursued sufficiently robustly. He supports an expanded U.S. military presence in East Asia and an expansion of U.S. free trade agreements with Asian countries. He was a top adviser to the Romney campaign on policy, including U.S. policy toward China, and has been called "hawkish". Chen viewed China as a topic that distinguished Romney in the 2012 campaign.

Other foreign policy views
Chen accompanied Mitt Romney on his campaign swing through Britain, Israel, and Poland in August 2012 and was one of the advisers who approved Romney's criticism of President Obama in the wake of the attack on the embassy in Libya on September 11, 2012, and the resulting death of J. Christopher Stevens.

Personal life
Chen has been described by the National Journal as a "prodigy." He has spent time in government, academia, and the private sector. He is a Protestant Christian. Chen is married to Cynthia Fung Chen, an attorney. The couple has two children, and lives in the San Francisco Bay Area.

See also
 Committee of 100 (United States)
 History of the Chinese Americans in Los Angeles

References

External links
 Lanhee Chen's columns at Bloomberg View
 
 

1978 births
American campaign managers
American Christians
American lawyers of Chinese descent
American politicians of Taiwanese descent
California politicians of Chinese descent
American political consultants
California Republicans
George W. Bush 2004 presidential campaign
Harvard Law School alumni
Hoover Institution people
Living people
Mitt Romney 2012 presidential campaign
People associated with Gibson Dunn
People associated with the 2004 United States presidential election
People associated with the 2008 United States presidential election
People associated with the 2012 United States presidential election
People associated with the 2016 United States presidential election
People from Fayetteville, North Carolina
People from Los Angeles County, California
Asian conservatism in the United States